Corticium penicillatum is a species of fungus in the class Agaricomycetes. It is a corticioid fungus and a plant pathogen, the causal agent of coconut thread blight, a leaf disease of coconut palms. The species was originally described from Papua New Guinea in 1925 and has since been reported from Vanuatu, Fiji, and the Solomon Islands. Corticium penicillatum has never been redescribed or reviewed and is unlikely to be a species of Corticium in the modern sense.

References

External links 
 Index Fungorum
 USDA ARS Fungal Database

Fungal plant pathogens and diseases
Coconut palm diseases
Taxa named by Thomas Petch
Fungi of Oceania
Fungi of New Guinea
Fungi described in 1925
Fungi without expected TNC conservation status